In Islam, a nafl prayer, (pl. Nawafil) (ṣalāt al-nafl) or supererogatory prayer, is a type of optional Muslim salah (formal worship). As with sunnah prayer, they are not considered obligatory but are thought to confer extra benefit on the person performing them. An example is the offering of 
four raka'ahs of "nafl"  before the compulsory Zuhr prayers.

According to the following Hadith, "nafl" not only draws a person closer to Allah but also helps one attain the better success in the Afterworld i.e. Jannah (Paradise).

Tahiyatul Wudu

Tahiyatul wudu is the nafl prayer after doing wudhu.

Abu Hureyrah (RA) narrates that once the Islamic prophet Muhammad asked Bilal at Fajr salah:

Bilal replied:

Abu Hureyrah narrated that Muhammad said to Bilal

Bilal said :

There are 6 rakats in Tahiyatul Wudhu.

It should not be performed during the improper (makruh) times; when the sun rises, when it is at zenith and when it sets.

Tahiyyatul Masjid (Nafl prayer when entering Masjid)

Abu Qatada narrated that Muhammad said: 
“If any one of you enters a mosque, he should pray two raka’ats before sitting.”Narrated by Al-Bukhari and Muslim (Sahih)

This is a 2 Rak'aah Nafl prayer which one should perform as one enters the Masjid and on proper times.

Ishraq prayer
The time for the Ishraq prayer begins fifteen to twenty minutes after sunrise and consists of two Raka'ahs. Praying ishraq is considered to yield greater rewards than performing the lesser Umrah according to some traditions. According to majority of scholars of Hadith and Fiqh, Duha Prayer and Al-Ishraq Prayer are all names of the same salah (ritual prayer). It is a recommended prayer without any fixed number of raka'ahs, and its time proper starts approximately fifteen minutes after sunrise and extends up to the time of the declining of the sun from the meridian.

Duha or Chasht prayer

Duha prayer begins after sunrise and ends at meridian, and is generally thought to include at least two raka'ahs, though in some traditions the number is four or even twelve. According to the Sunni thought, performing this prayer is believed to be effective in seeking forgiveness for one's sins.

The Ishraq or Chasht or Duha prayer begins when the sun rises a quarter in the morning, and it ends before the time of Dhuhr prayer (i.e. obligatory prayer). It has been said that the one who performs chasht nafls, has a reward of 1 castle of Gold in Jannah. i.e. 1 Chasht prayer = 1 gold castle. 
Fatima used to be regular in this supererogatory prayer.
The supererogatory morning prayer has been narrated from Muhammad, through paths that have reached mass-narration levels – from 19 to over 30 companions – according to Imam al-Tabari, al-`Ayni in `Umdat al-Qari, al-Haytami, al-Munawi, and al-Qari in Sharh al-Shama'il, Ibn Hajar in Fath al-Bari, al-Kattani in Nazm al-Mutanathir, and as per the monographs compiled by al-Hakim and al-Suyuti as well as the recensions of Abu Zur`a al-`Iraqi in Tarh al-Tathrib, Ibn al-Qayyim in Zad al-Ma`ad, and al-Shawkani in Nayl al-Awtar. According to the vast majority of the Ulema of the Salaf and Khalaf it is a desirable and recommended prayer.

Awabeen
Salat al-Awwabin - is the "prayer of the Oft-Returning" as specified by Muhammad and is offered between Maghrib prayer and Isha prayer. However, many scholars say the there are no sahih hadiths confirming that Salat al-Awwabin is to be prayed between Maghrib and Isha prayers and they are of the opinion that, in fact, it is the same prayer as Duha.

Four Rak'aah Sunnah of Dhuhr

Muhammad is reported to have said that whoever performs the four rakaats before or after the Dhuhr prayer with constancy, God makes the fire of Hell haram (forbidden) for him. [Mishkat,(Hasan-Chain) p. 104; Tirmizi, Abu Da'ud, Nisai 1814, Ibn Majah]

Muhammad is reported to have said that after the worshipper prays the four rakaats of Dhuhr salah, the doors of heaven are opened, i.e. the salah becomes accepted by God, and the cause of its acceptance comes down on the worshipper as rays of mercy. [Mishkat, p. 104]

'Aishah, the wife of Muhammad:
The Prophet (ﷺ) never omitted four rak'ahs before the noon (Dhuhr) prayer, and two rak'ahs before the dawn prayer. (Abi Dawud - 1253)

Four Rak'aah Sunnah of Asr
Muhammad said: "May Allah have mercy on the one who offers four (rak'ahs) before 'Asr prayer." (Abu Dawud - 1273)

Muhammad said: "May Allah have mercy upon a man who prays four (rak'ahs) before Al-Asr." (Jami` at-Tirmidhi - 430)

Two Rak'aah Sunnah of Maghrib
Before prayer

Muhammad said: "Pray before Maghrib, pray before Maghrib" then he said at the third time, "Whoever wishes (to)". He said so, because he did not like the people to take it as a Sunnah.  (Bukhari - 1183)

After prayer

Muhammad said: "Whoever persists in performing twelve Rak’ah from the Sunnah, a house will be built for him in Paradise: four before the Zuhr, two Rak’ah after Zuhr, two Rak’ah after Maghrib, two Rak’ah after the ‘Isha’ and two Rak’ah before Fajr." (Sunan Ibn Majah - 1140)

Two Rak'aah Sunnah of Isha

After prayer

"I memorized from the Prophet (ﷺ) ten (voluntary) Rak'at - two Rak'at before the Dhuhr prayer and two after it; two Rak'at after Maghrib prayer in his house, and two Rak'at after 'Isha' prayer in his house, and two Rak'at before the Fajr prayer. " (alBukhari - 1180) (Muslim - 729)

Forbidden times
There are times when it is forbidden for one to perform supererogatory prayers. During these times, supererogatory prayers are either makrooh (disliked) or haram (forbidden). The forbidden times are after performing the Fajr prayer, after Asr prayer, when the sun is still rising or setting and during a Friday sermon. Exceptions are made when the prayer is Tahiyyat masjid, when making up missed prayers and when the prayer is performed in Masjid al-Haram where prayers are valid at any hour of the day and night.

See also
 Sunnah salah
 Ghufayla Prayer
 Jumu'ah Salah

References

Salah
Salah terminology